Joseph Lane Kirkland  (March 12, 1922 – August 14, 1999) was an American labor union leader who served as President of the AFL–CIO from 1979 to 1995.

Life and career
Kirkland was born in Camden, South Carolina, the son of Louise Beardsley (Richardson) and Randolph Withers Kirkland. He rose over his career to head the 16-million-member American labor movement.

In 1941, Kirkland entered the United States Merchant Marine Academy, graduated 1942, and became a deck officer on U.S. merchant ships during World War II. After the war, he worked in the Research Department of the AFL. He received a B.S. degree from the Edmund A. Walsh School of Foreign Service at Georgetown University.

Kirkland married Edith Draper Hollyday in June 1944, with whom he had five daughters.

A year after their divorce in 1972, he married the Prague-born Irena Neumann (1925–2007). An Auschwitz survivor, Neumann had previously been married to film producer Henry T. Weinstein, who had directed Marilyn Monroe's final unfinished picture. The couple had been close to Monroe during the last months of her life.

From 1979 to 1995 Kirkland was president of the American Federation of Labor – Congress of Industrial Organizations (AFL–CIO). During his tenure, union membership in the United States declined precipitously. The unions suffered some of their most serious defeats, including the 1981 air traffic controllers' strike and the 1985–1986 Hormel strike. He also served on the Federal Prison Industries, Incorporated (FPI) board from 1980-1988, representing Labor during FPI's growth years. On the international front, Kirkland's support of the Solidarity movement in Poland contributed to the decline of communism. According to Michael Szporer in Solidarity: The Great Workers Strike of 1980, American Unions under the leadership of Lane Kirkland contributed $150,000 shortly after the successful Solidarity Strike, as early as September 1980. At the time, the Carter administration, including its two prominent Polish Americans, Zbigniew Brzezinski and Ed Muskie advised against such aid fearing Soviet reaction. Kirkland boldly took the initiative persuading Zbigniew Brzezinski of the wisdom of supporting the Solidarity movement. In all U.S. union support of Solidarity far exceeded its European counterparts. Solidarity aid was part of Lane Kirkland's internationalist vision for the labor movement and the building of the global consensus on human rights. After the changes in Eastern Europe, Kirkland became a mentor for many prominent labor leaders who saw him as a visionary and visited him in his office at the George Meany Center. He befriended Lech Walesa as well as Marian Krzaklewski who replaced Lech Walesa at the helm of Solidarity. Kirkland was awarded posthumously with the highest Polish award, the Order of the White Eagle. The Polish American Freedom Foundation has established a grant in Lane Kirkland's honor, and his union, the International Organization of Masters, Mates and Pilots, has established the non-profit Captain Richard Phillips-Lane Kirkland Maritime Trust partly in his memory.

His best remembered quotation is:

On November 13, 1989, Kirkland was presented with the Presidential Citizens Medal by President Bush.

In 1994, Kirkland was awarded the Presidential Medal of Freedom by President Clinton.
 
In 1999, Lane Kirkland was awarded the Truman-Reagan Medal of Freedom.

Lane Kirkland died in Washington, D.C., age 77, from complications of cancer.

Notes

References

External links

 American Center for International Labor Solidarity, formerly the International Affairs Department of the AFL–CIO
 Lane Kirkland: The AFL–CIO's last cold warrior by Jim Smith
 Freedom's Labors: Lane Kirkland worked for more than his union by Fred Siegel. Wall Street Journal. OpinionJournal.com. Tuesday, March 8, 2005. Accessed April 3, 2005.
 
 Lane Kirkland papers at the University of Maryland libraries
 
 The American Presidency Project
 Lane Kirkland (1922–1999) AFL–CIO history page

1922 births
1999 deaths
American sailors
Presidents of the AFL–CIO
Walsh School of Foreign Service alumni
People from Camden, South Carolina
United States Merchant Marine Academy alumni
20th-century American politicians
Deaths from cancer in Washington, D.C.
Presidential Citizens Medal recipients
Presidential Medal of Freedom recipients
Recipients of the Four Freedoms Award
United States Merchant Mariners of World War II
Recipients of the Order of the White Eagle (Poland)